Karen Jane McNamara (born 23 April 1964) is an Australian politician. She was a Liberal member of the Australian House of Representatives from 2013 to 2016, representing the New South Wales electorate of Dobell. She lost her seat at the 2016 election. She was replaced by Emma McBride who recorded a 7.6% swing to Labor.

Career
McNamara is a former New South Wales public servant, serving in senior roles for over 20 years. McNamara managed the electoral campaign of Darren Webber for the electorate of Wyong at the 2011 New South Wales state election. In 2013 Webber was forced to resign from the Liberal Party, due to irregularities in his electoral fundraising creating corruption concerns.

At the 2013 Australian federal election, McNamara won the Central Coast seat of Dobell, ousting sitting member, independent Craig Thomson, and narrowly defeating Labor candidate Emma McBride. At the 2016 election, McBride, the daughter of former state MP Grant McBride, turned the tables, defeating McNamara after achieving a swing of over four percent.

References

1964 births
Living people
People from Falkirk
Liberal Party of Australia members of the Parliament of Australia
Members of the Australian House of Representatives for Dobell
Members of the Australian House of Representatives
Women members of the Australian House of Representatives
21st-century Australian politicians
21st-century Australian women politicians